Jonathan Satter (born January 1969) is an American business executive and government official.

In 2019, Florida Governor Ron DeSantis appointed Satter as the secretary of the Florida Department of Management Services.  As Secretary, Satter acted as the chief operating officer of state government, overseeing business, workforce, and technology operations for the 3rd largest state government in the United States with 100,000+ employees, and a $100 billion budget. Satter was unanimously confirmed by the Florida Senate.

In April 2020, in response to the effects of COVID-19 on the Florida economy, Ron DeSantis increased Satter's responsibilities by naming him as the unemployment "czar", overseeing all responses to the unemployment crisis in Florida, taking the responsibilities away from Department of Economic Opportunity Director Ken Lawson.   Shortly after the appointment, the unemployment system showed slow but significant improvement under Satter. A month after Satter took over, DeSantis claimed many of the problems had been fixed, and that “99.99 percent” of people who had filed claims correctly had been paid.  According to the Tampa Bay Times, Satter's role was one of 8 key decisions Ron DeSantis has made that shaped Florida’s response to the pandemic.  

In February 2021, media reported that Satter would be leaving the Ron DeSantis administration and return to the private sector.  

In April 2022, PE Hub reported that Satter had been named Chief Operating Officer and Managing Director of White Wolf Capital Group, a Florida based investment firm.  Satter previously had served as a Senior Advisor and board member of the firm.  White Wolf Capital is a private investment firm that began operations in late 2011 and is focused on making both direct and indirect investments in leading middle market companies located in North America.  On the direct side, White Wolf Capital seeks both private equity as well as private credit investment opportunities in companies with $20 million to $200 million in revenues and up to $20 million in EBITDA. Typical situations include, management buyouts, leveraged buyouts, recapitalizations and investments for growth. Preferred industries include manufacturing, business services, information technology, security, aerospace and defense.  

In October 2022, Florida Governor Ron DeSantis appointed Satter to the Board of Directors of both Enterprise Florida and Space Florida. 

From 2013 to 2018, Satter was managing director of US operations, and principal of Avison Young, which had acquired his firm.   

Satter was appointed by Florida Governor Jeb Bush in 2005, and reappointed in 2006, to serve as a commissioner of the Health Care District of Palm Beach County.  In 2008, Satter was elected chairman of the board of commissioners of the Health Care District, a comprehensive and diverse public health care delivery system, overseeing 1,000+ employees and a $275+ million budget. In 2011, Satter was unanimously reelected for an unprecedented fourth term as Chairman, a step so unusual that it required a change to the district’s bylaws.

Personal life

In 2010, Satter married LPGA professional golfer Michelle McGann in Ogunquit Maine. Satter and McGann reside in North Palm Beach, Florida.

References

21st-century American businesspeople
Living people
1969 births
People from North Palm Beach, Florida
Date of birth missing (living people)
Place of birth missing (living people)